Marc Weber (born 5 July 1973) is a Swiss former professional ice hockey centre. He played in the Swiss Nationalliga A for EHC Biel, SC Rapperswil-Jona Lakers and SC Bern.

Achievements
2004 - NLA Champion with SC Bern  Marc Weber scored the game-winning goal in the overtime of the last playoff finals game against HC Lugano.

External links

Weber on hockeyfans.ch

1973 births
Living people
EHC Biel players
People from Biel/Bienne
SC Rapperswil-Jona Lakers players
Swiss ice hockey centres
SC Bern players
Sportspeople from the canton of Bern